

Duchess consort of Parma

House of Farnese, 1545–1731

House of Bourbon-Anjou, 1731–1735
None

House of Habsburg, 1735–1748

House of Bourbon-Parma, 1748–1802

House of Habsburg-Lorraine, 1814–1847

House of Bourbon-Parma, 1847–1859

Nominal Duchesses of Parma

House of Bourbon-Parma, since 1859

Sources
NORTHERN ITALY (1)

 
Parma, consorts
Parma, consorts
Parma, consorts